The 2009 Tour de France was the 96th edition of Tour de France, one of cycling's Grand Tours. This Tour featured 180 riders from 30 countries on 20 cycling teams, starting in the principality of Monaco on 4 July and finishing on the Champs-Élysées in Paris on 26 July.

Of the teams taking part in the Giro, 17 were ProTour teams, and 3 were Professional Continental teams.  were the only ProTour team not to receive an invitation. Each of the 20 teams invited to the race entered a squad of nine riders.

Twenty-four riders abandoned the three-week race before reaching Paris. Alberto Contador of the  team won the race; after winning the 15th stage to Verbier, and thus taking over the yellow jersey which he kept until the end of the race.



Teams

Cyclists

Nationality

Selection information
  announced their selection on 18 June, including Denis Menchov, Grischa Niermann, Juan Antonio Flecha, Óscar Freire, Juan Manuel Gárate, Stef Clement, Joost Posthuma, Laurens ten Dam and Robert Gesink.
  announced Vladimir Efimkin, Cyril Dessel, Stéphane Goubert, Lloyd Mondory, and José Luis Arrieta on 21 June. Christophe Riblon, Nicolas Roche, Hubert Dupont, and Cyril Dessel complete the roster.
  announced their selection on 22 June, including Andy Schleck, Fränk Schleck, Fabian Cancellara, Stuart O'Grady, Jens Voigt, Nicki Sørensen, Chris Anker Sørensen, Gustav Larsson and Kurt Asle Arvesen.
  announced their team on 24 June as Julian Dean, David Millar, Christian Vande Velde, Bradley Wiggins, David Zabriskie, Tyler Farrar, Dan Martin, Ryder Hesjedal and Danny Pate. Dan Martin withdrew due to a long-term knee problem, and was replaced by Martijn Maaskant, who had previously been named as first reserve.
  announced Filippo Pozzato, Vladimir Karpets, Danilo Napolitano, Alexander Bocharov, Serguei Ivanov, Mikhail Ignatiev, Nikolai Trusov, Joan Horrach and Stijn Vandenbergh.
  announced Heinrich Haussler, Thor Hushovd, and Carlos Sastre on 23 June. Íñigo Cuesta, José Ángel Gómez Marchante, Volodymir Gustov, Andreas Klier, Brett Lancaster and Hayden Roulston were announced the following day.
  announced Sandy Casar, Anthony Geslin, Jérôme Coppel, Yauheni Hutarovich, Sébastien Joly, Christophe Le Mével, Benoît Vaugrenard and Jussi Veikkanen. The ninth rider will be either Rémy Di Gregorio or Jérémy Roy.
  announced that Alberto Contador, Lance Armstrong, Andreas Klöden, Levi Leipheimer, Yaroslav Popovych, Sérgio Paulinho, Dmitriy Muravyev, Grégory Rast and Haimar Zubeldia will be racing in the 2009 Tour de France.
  announced their roster on June 15. Stéphane Augé, Samuel Dumoulin, Leonardo Duque, Bingen Fernández, Christophe Kern, Sébastien Minard, Amaël Moinard, David Moncoutié, Rémi Pauriol make up the Cofidis roster.
  announced that Gerald Ciolek, Markus Fothen, Johannes Fröhlinger, Linus Gerdemann, Christian Knees, Niki Terpstra, Peter Velits, Fabian Wegmann and Peter Wrolich will race. Ciolek and Gerdemann will be co-leaders.
  announced Maxime Bouet, David Lelay, and Christophe Moreau on 23 June. On June 29 the other six riders were announced. Sylvain Calzati, Nicolas Vogondy, Brice Feillu, Romain Feillu, Eduardo Gonzalo, Geoffroy Lequatre make up the rest of the roster.
  announced Yukiya Arashiro, William Bonnet, Pierrick Fédrigo, Pierre Rolland, Yuri Trofimov and Thomas Voeckler on 23 June.
  has confirmed David Arroyo, Iván Gutiérrez, Luis Pasamontes, Luis León Sánchez, Xabier Zandio and Óscar Pereiro will start. They have also announced that Alejandro Valverde will not be on their squad due to the ban imposed upon him by the Italian National Olympic Committee.
  announced their roster on June 26. Mikel Astarloza, Egoi Martínez, Alan Pérez, Amets Txurruka, Gorka Verdugo, Rubén Pérez, Juan José Oroz, Koldo Fernández, and Igor Antón make up the roster.
  announced Daniele Bennati, Vincenzo Nibali, Franco Pellizotti, Roman Kreuziger, Fabio Sabatini, Aleksandr Kuschynski, Alessandro Vanotti, Frederik Willems and Brian Bach Vandborg.
  has confirmed Cadel Evans, Thomas Dekker, Mickaël Delage, Sebastian Lang, Matthew Lloyd, Staf Scheirlinckx, Greg Van Avermaet, Jurgen Van den Broeck, and Johan Vansummeren as of 26 June.  Dekker was subsequently suspended by the team after a re-test of a December 2007 sample revealed use of erythropoietin, and he was replaced by Charlie Wegelius.
  announced Simon Geschke, Jonathan Hivert, Cyril Lemoine, Piet Rooijakkers, Albert Timmer and Kenny van Hummel on 23 June. On June 29 the other three riders were announced. Fumiyuki Beppu, Thierry Hupond, and Koen de Kort make up the roster.
  announced their roster on June 26. Marco Bandiera, Angelo Furlan, Marco Marzano, Daniele Righi, Simon Špilak, Massimiliano Mori, Mirco Lorenzetto, Marzio Bruseghin, and Alessandro Ballan make up their roster.
  announced their short list on June 26. Sylvain Chavanel, Jérôme Pineau, Stijn Devolder, and Carlos Barredo were on the short list. On June 29 the other five riders were announced. Matteo Tosatto, Steven de Jongh, Jurgen Van de Walle, and Jérôme Pineau make up the roster. Tom Boonen or Allan Davis will receive the ninth spot on the roster.
  announced their roster on June 26. Mark Cavendish, George Hincapie, Tony Martin, Mark Renshaw, Michael Rogers, Maxime Monfort, Kim Kirchen, Bernhard Eisel, and Marcus Burghardt make up the roster.

References

2009 Tour de France
2009